Hedda Gabler is a 1961 Australian television play based on the 1891 play by Henrik Ibsen. It was made at a time when Australian TV drama was rare.

Plot
Hedda Gabler pursues the destruction of a former lover.

Cast
June Brunell as Hedda
Richard Davies as George Tesman	 	
Edward Howel as Brack
Wynn Roberts as Eilert Lovborg
Dorothy Bradley as Bertha	
Moira Carleton as Julia Tesman
Pat Connolly as Thea Elvsted

Production
Brunell's casting was announced in November 1960. Wendy Pomroy recorded the music.

Reception
The Age said the production "had excellent sets and dressing, fine technical presentation and the assistance of a strong cast", but felt Brunell "interpreted Hedda in too 'genteel' a fashion."

The critic for the Sydney Morning Herald wrote that the play suffered from "adequate rather than generous acting" except for June Brunell in the lead, who was praised. The Age TV critic felt Brunell was "too genteel" in the lead but thought the production had "excellent sets and dressing".

Richard Lane, who did the adaptation, said that Edward Howell as "chilling" as Brack, "it was a character that suited him perfectly."

References

External links
Hedda Gabbler at National Film and Sound Archive
Hedda Gabler at IMDb

Australian television films
1961 television plays
Films based on works by Henrik Ibsen
Films directed by William Sterling (director)